Night Ride Home is the 14th album by Canadian singer-songwriter Joni Mitchell, released in 1991. It was the last of four albums she recorded for Geffen Records.

Songs on the album include "Cherokee Louise" about a childhood friend who suffered sexual abuse, "The Windfall (Everything for Nothing)" about a maid who tried to sue Mitchell, and the retrospective single release "Come in from the Cold" about childhood and middle age. The title song "Night Ride Home" (originally titled "Fourth of July" and first performed during promotion for her previous album in 1988) was inspired by a moonlit night in Hawaii. Though the album contained no charting singles, it received critical acclaim, and the track "Come in from the Cold" received airplay on AOR stations.

This was Mitchell's first album not to be distributed by the WEA family of labels. She had been signed to WEA's Asylum and Reprise labels in the past, and Warner Bros. Records had been the distributor for Geffen Records from 1980 to 1990. That year, Geffen was sold to MCA Music (now Universal Music Group), as a result, the album was distributed by Uni Distribution Corp. (the distribution arm of MCA Music), which also took over the rest of the Geffen catalogue.

A home video release, Come In from the Cold, was released the same year and features promo videos for five tracks from the album along with an interview with Mitchell discussing the inspiration behind them.

, the album has sold 238,000 copies in the US.

Track listing
All songs, words and music by Joni Mitchell; except where indicated

"Night Ride Home" – 3:21
"Passion Play (When All the Slaves Are Free)" – 5:25
"Cherokee Louise" – 4:32
"The Windfall (Everything for Nothing)" – 5:15
"Slouching Towards Bethlehem" (based on the poem "The Second Coming" by W. B. Yeats) – 6:54
"Come in from the Cold" – 7:31
"Nothing Can Be Done" (words: Joni Mitchell; music: Larry Klein) – 4:53 
"The Only Joy in Town" – 5:11
"Ray's Dad's Cadillac" – 4:33
"Two Grey Rooms" – 3:57

Personnel
 Joni Mitchell – vocals, guitar, keyboards, percussion, Birotron on 6, oboe on 8, Omnichord on 8
 Wayne Shorter – soprano saxophone on 3, 9
 Bill Dillon – guitar on 2, 7; pedal steel guitar on 1
 Michael Landau – guitar on 10
 Larry Klein – bass; percussion on 1, 2, 3, 5, 6; guitar on 6; keyboards on 7
 Vinnie Colaiuta – drums on 4, 5, 6, 10; snare drum on 3
 Alex Acuña – percussion on 1, 2, 5, 6, 7, 8
 Karen Peris – backing vocals on 3
 Brenda Russell – backing vocals on 9
 David Baerwald – backing vocals on 7
 Jeremy Lubbock – conductor, arranger, string arrangement on 10

Charts

References

External links 
 Discogs listing

Joni Mitchell albums
1991 albums
Albums produced by Larry Klein
Geffen Records albums
Albums produced by Joni Mitchell
Albums recorded at A&M Studios